Vlastimil Fuňák (born October 2, 1982) is a Slovak handball
player, currently playing for 1.MHK Košice in the Slovak Extraliga.
He also played in HT Tatran Prešov.

External links
 Vlastimil Funak at eurohandball.com

Slovak male handball players
1982 births
Living people
People from Vranov nad Topľou
Sportspeople from the Prešov Region